

QI01A Domestic fowl

QI01AA Inactivated viral vaccines
QI01AA01 Avian infectious bursal (gumboro) disease virus
QI01AA02 Newcastle disease virus/paramyxovirus
QI01AA03 Avian infectious bronchitis virus
QI01AA04 Avian reovirus
QI01AA05 Avian adenovirus
QI01AA06 Avian infectious bronchitis virus + avian infectious bursal (gumboro) disease virus + newcastle disease virus/paramyxovirus + avian rhinotracheitis virus
QI01AA07 Avian infectious bronchitis virus + avian infectious bursal (gumboro) disease virus + newcastle disease virus/paramyxovirus + avian rhinotracheitis virus + avian adenovirus
QI01AA08 Avian infectious bronchitis virus + avian infectious bursal (gumboro) disease virus + newcastle disease virus/paramyxovirus
QI01AA09 Newcastle disease virus/paramyxovirus + avian infectious bursal (gumboro) disease virus + avian adenovirus
QI01AA10 Avian infectious bronchitis virus + newcastle disease virus/paramyxovirus
QI01AA11 Avian infectious bursal (gumboro) disease virus + newcastle disease virus/paramyxovirus
QI01AA12 Newcastle disease virus/paramyxovirus + avian adenovirus + avian adenovirus
QI01AA13 Newcastle disease virus/paramyxovirus + avian infectious bronchitis virus + avian adenovirus
QI01AA14 Avian infectious bronchitis virus + avian adenovirus
QI01AA15 Avian infectious bronchitis virus + avian infectious bursal (gumboro) disease virus
QI01AA16 Avian infectious bronchitis virus + avian infectious bursal (gumboro) disease virus + newcastle disease virus/paramyxovirus + avian reovirus
QI01AA17 Avian rhinotracheitis virus
QI01AA18 Avian infectious bronchitis virus + newcastle disease virus/paramyxovirus + avian adenovirus + avian rhinotracheitis virus
QI01AA19 Avian infectious bronchitis virus + avian infectious bursal (gumboro) disease virus + newcastle disease virus/paramyxovirus + avian adenovirus
QI01AA20 Newcastle disease virus/paramyxovirus + avian rhinotracheitis virus
QI01AA21 Avian infectious bronchitis virus + newcastle disease virus/paramyxovirus + avian rhinotracheitis virus
QI01AA22 Avian infectious bursal (gumboro) disease virus + avian reovirus
QI01AA23 Avian influenza virus
QI01AA24 Avian infectious bronchitis virus + avian infectious bursal (gumboro) disease virus + newcastle disease virus / paramyxovirus + avian reovirus + avian adenovirus + avian rhinotracheitis virus
QI01AA25 Avian infectious bronchitis virus + avian infectious bursal (gumboro) disease virus + newcastle disease virus / paramyxovirus + avian reovirus + avian adenovirus
QI01AA26 Avian infectious bronchitis virus + avian infectious bursal (gumboro) disease virus + newcastle disease virus / paramyxovirus + avian reovirus + avian rhinotracheitis virus

QI01AB Inactivated bacterial vaccines (including mycoplasma, toxoid and chlamydia)
QI01AB01 Salmonella
QI01AB02 Pasteurella
QI01AB03 Mycoplasma
QI01AB04 Haemophilus
QI01AB05 Escherichia
QI01AB06 Erysipelothrix
QI01AB07 Ornithobacterium
QI01AB08 Clostridium

QI01AC Inactivated bacterial vaccines and antisera
Empty group

QI01AD Live viral vaccines
QI01AD01 Avian rhinotracheitis virus
QI01AD02 Avian encephalomyelitis virus
QI01AD03 Avian herpes virus (Marek's disease)
QI01AD04 Chicken anaemia
QI01AD05 Avian adenovirus
QI01AD06 Newcastle disease virus/paramyxovirus
QI01AD07 Avian infectious bronchitis virus
QI01AD08 Avian infectious laryngotracheitis virus
QI01AD09 Avian infectious bursal (gumboro) disease virus
QI01AD10 Avian reovirus
QI01AD11 Avian infectious bursal (gumboro) disease virus + newcastle disease virus/paramyxovirus
QI01AD12 Avian pox virus
QI01AD13 Avian leucosis virus
QI01AD14 Avian reticuloendotheliosis
QI01AD15 Avian infectious bursal (gumboro) disease virus + avian herpes virus (Marek's disease)
QI01AD16 Avian herpes virus (Marek's disease) + avian infectious bursal disease virus (gumboro disease) + newcastle disease virus/paramyxovirus
QI01AD17 Avian herpes virus (Marek's disease) + avian infectious laryngotracheitis virus + newcastle disease virus/paramyxovirus
QI01AD18 Avian herpes virus (Marek's disease) + avian infectious laryngotracheitis virus + avian infectious bursal disease virus (gumboro) disease

QI01AE Live bacterial vaccines
QI01AE01 Salmonella
QI01AE02 Pasteurella
QI01AE03 Mycoplasma
QI01AE04 Escherichia
QI01AE05 Erysipelothrix

QI01AF Live bacterial and viral vaccines
Empty group

QI01AG Live and inactivated bacterial vaccines
Empty group

QI01AH Live and inactivated viral vaccines
Empty group

QI01AI Live viral and inactivated bacterial vaccines
Empty group

QI01AJ Live and inactivated viral and bacterial vacciness
Empty group

QI01AK Inactivated viral and live bacterial vaccines
Empty group

QI01AL Inactivated viral and inactivated bacterial vaccines
QI01AL01 Newcastle disease virus/paramyxovirus + escherichia + pasteurella
QI01AL02 Newcastle disease virus/paramyxovirus + avian infectious bronchitis virus + haemophilus
QI01AL03 Newcastle disease virus/paramyxovirus + haemophilus
QI01AL04 Newcastle disease virus/paramyxovirus + pasteurella
QI01AL05 Newcastle disease virus/paramyxovirus + avian infectious bronchitis virus + avian adenovirus + haemophilus
QI01AL06 Newcastle disease virus/paramyxovirus + avian infectious bronchitis virus + escherichia + pasteurella
QI01AL07 Newcastle disease virus/paramyxovirus + salmonella + pasteurella

QI01AM Antisera, immunoglobulin preparations, and antitoxins
Empty group

QI01AN Live parasitic vaccines
QI01AN01 Coccidia

QI01AO Inactivated parasitic
QI01AO01 Coccidia

QI01AP Live fungal vaccines
Empty group

QI01AQ Inactivated fungal vaccines
Empty group

QI01AR In vivo diagnostic preparations
Empty group

QI01AS Allergens
Empty group

QI01AU Other live vaccines
Empty group

QI01AV Other inactivated vaccines
Empty group

QI01AX Other immunologicals
Empty group

QI01B Duck

QI01BA Inactivated viral vaccines
QI01BA01 Duck parvovirus + goose parvovirus

QI01BB Inactivated bacterial vaccines (including mycoplasma, toxoid and chlamydia)
QI01BB01 Clostridium

QI01BC Inactivated bacterial vaccines and antisera
Empty group

QI01BD Live viral vaccines
QI01BD01 Duck enteritis virus
QI01BD02 Duck hepatitis virus
QI01BD03 Duck parvovirus

QI01BE Live bacterial vaccines
Empty group

QI01BF Live bacterial and viral vaccines
Empty group

QI01BG Live and inactivated bacterial vaccines
Empty group

QI01BH Live and inactivated viral vaccines
QI01BH01 Live goose parvovirus + inactivated duck parvovirus

QI01BI Live viral and inactivated bacterial vaccines
Empty group

QI01BJ Live and inactivated viral and bacterial vaccines
Empty group

QI01BK Inactivated viral and live bacterial vaccines
Empty group

QI01BL Inactivated viral and inactivated bacterial vaccines
Empty group

QI01BM Antisera, immunoglobulin preparations, and antitoxins
Empty group

QI01BN Live parasitic vaccines
Empty group

QI01BO Inactivated parasitic vaccines
Empty group

QI01BP Live fungal vaccines
Empty group

QI01BQ Inactivated fungal vaccines
Empty group

QI01BR In vivo diagnostic preparations
Empty group

QI01BS Allergens
Empty group

QI01BU Other live vaccines
Empty group

QI01BV Other inactivated vaccines
Empty group

QI01BX Other immunologicals
Empty group

QI01C Turkey

QI01CA Inactivated viral vaccines
QI01CA01 Turkey paramyxovirus
QI01CA02 Turkey paramyxovirus + turkey rhinotracheitis virus
QI01CA03 Newcastle disease virus/paramyxovirus + avian adenovirus

QI01CB Inactivated bacterial vaccines (including mycoplasma, toxoid and chlamydia)
QI01CB01 Pasteurella + erysipelothrix
QI01CB02 Erysipelothrix

QI01CC Inactivated bacterial vaccines and antisera
Empty group

QI01CD Live viral vaccines
QI01CD01 Turkey rhinotracheitis virus
QI01CD02 Turkey herpes virus

QI01CE Live bacterial vaccines
Empty group

QI01CF Live bacterial and viral vaccines
Empty group

QI01CG Live and inactivated bacterial vaccines
Empty group

QI01CH Live and inactivated viral vaccines
Empty group

QI01CI Live viral and inactivated bacterial vaccines
Empty group

QI01CJ Live and inactivated viral and bacterial vaccines
Empty group

QI01CK Inactivated viral and live bacterial vaccines
Empty group

QI01CL Inactivated viral and inactivated bacterial vaccines
QI01CL01 Newcastle disease virus/paramyxovirus + avian adenovirus + avian influenza virus + pasteurella

QI01CM Antisera, immunoglobulin preparations, and antitoxins
Empty group

QI01CN Live parasitic vaccines
Empty group

QI01CO Inactivated parasitic vaccines
Empty group

QI01CP Live fungal vaccines
Empty group

QI01CQ Inactivated fungal vaccines
Empty group

QI01CR In vivo diagnostic preparations
Empty group

QI01CS Allergens
Empty group

QI01CU Other live vaccines
Empty group

QI01CV Other inactivated vaccines
Empty group

QI01CX Other immunologicals
Empty group

QI01D Goose

QI01DA Inactivated viral vaccines
Empty group

QI01DB Inactivated bacterial vaccines (including mycoplasma, toxoid and chlamydia)
Empty group

QI01DC Inactivated bacterial vaccines and antisera
Empty group

QI01DD Live viral vaccines
QI01DD01 Goose parvovirus

QI01DE Live bacterial vaccines
Empty group

QI01DF Live bacterial and viral vaccines
Empty group

QI01DG Live and inactivated bacterial vaccines
Empty group

QI01DH Live and inactivated viral vaccines
Empty group

QI01DI Live viral and inactivated bacterial vaccines
Empty group

QI01DJ Live and inactivated viral and bacterial vaccines
Empty group

QI01DK Inactivated viral and live bacterial vaccines
Empty group

QI01DL Inactivated viral and inactivated bacterial vaccines
Empty group

QI01DM Antisera, immunoglobulin preparations, and antitoxins
QI01DM01 Goose parvovirus antiserum

QI01DN Live parasitic vaccines
Empty group

QI01DO Inactivated parasitic vaccines
Empty group

QI01DP Live fungal vaccines
Empty group

QI01DQ Inactivated fungal vaccines
Empty group

QI01DR In vivo diagnostic preparations
Empty group

QI01DS Allergens
Empty group

QI01DU Other live vaccines
Empty group

QI01DV Other inactivated vaccines
Empty group

QI01DX Other immunologicals
Empty group

QI01E Pigeon

QI01EA Inactivated viral vaccines
QI01EA01 Pigeon paramyxovirus

QI01EB Inactivated bacterial vaccines (including mycoplasma, toxoid and chlamydia)
Empty group

QI01EC Inactivated bacterial vaccines and antisera
Empty group

QI01ED Live viral vaccines
QI01ED01 Pigeon pox virus

QI01EE Live bacterial vaccines
QI01EE01 Salmonella

QI01EF Live bacterial and viral vaccines
Empty group

QI01EG Live and inactivated bacterial vaccines
Empty group

QI01EH Live and inactivated viral vaccines
QI01EH01 Live pigeon pox virus + inactivated pigeon paramyxovirus

QI01EI Live viral and inactivated bacterial vaccines
Empty group

QI01EJ Live and inactivated viral and bacterial vaccines
Empty group

QI01EK Inactivated viral and live bacterial vaccines
Empty group

QI01EL Inactivated viral and inactivated bacterial vaccines
Empty group

QI01EM Antisera, immunoglobulin preparations, and antitoxins
Empty group

QI01EN Live parasitic vaccines
Empty group

QI01EO Inactivated parasitic vaccines
Empty group

QI01EP Live fungal vaccines
Empty group

QI01EQ Inactivated fungal vaccines
Empty group

QI01ER In vivo diagnostic preparations
Empty group

QI01ES Allergens
Empty group

QI01EU Other live vaccines
Empty group

QI01EV Other inactivated vaccines
Empty group

QI01EX Other immunologicals
Empty group

QI01F Pheasant

Empty group

QI01G Quail

Empty group

QI01H Partridge

Empty group

QI01I Ostrich

Empty group

QI01K Pet birds

QI01KA Inactivated viral vaccines
QI01KA01 Pacheco's virus/herpesvirus

QI01KB Inactivated bacterial vaccines (including mycoplasma, toxoid and chlamydia)
Empty group

QI01KC Inactivated bacterial vaccines and antisera
Empty group

QI01KD Live viral vaccines
QI01KD01 Canary pox virus
QI01KD02 Pacheco's virus/herpesvirus

QI01KE Live bacterial vaccines
Empty group

QI01KF Live bacterial and viral vaccines
Empty group

QI01KG Live and inactivated bacterial vaccines
Empty group

QI01KH Live and inactivated viral vaccines
Empty group

QI01KI Live viral and inactivated bacterial vaccines
Empty group

QI01KJ Live and inactivated viral and bacterial vaccines
Empty group

QI01KK Inactivated viral and live bacterial vaccines
Empty group

QI01KL Inactivated viral and inactivated bacterial vaccines
Empty group

QI01KM Antisera, immunoglobulin preparations, and antitoxins
Empty group

QI01KN Live parasitic vaccines
Empty group

QI01KO Inactivated parasitic vaccines
Empty group

QI01KP Live fungal vaccines
Empty group

QI01KQ Inactivated fungal vaccines
Empty group

QI01KR In vivo diagnostic preparations
Empty group

QI01KS Allergens
Empty group

QI01KU Other live vaccines
Empty group

QI01KV Other inactivated vaccines
Empty group

QI01KX Other immunologicals
Empty group

QI01X Aves, others
Empty group

References

I01